Zygmuntowo may refer to the following places:
Zygmuntowo, Gmina Glinojeck in Masovian Voivodeship (east-central Poland)
Zygmuntowo, Gmina Opinogóra Górna in Masovian Voivodeship (east-central Poland)
Zygmuntowo, Wyszków County in Masovian Voivodeship (east-central Poland)
Zygmuntowo, Gmina Skulsk in Greater Poland Voivodeship (west-central Poland)
Zygmuntowo, Gmina Wilczyn in Greater Poland Voivodeship (west-central Poland)
Zygmuntowo, Kościan County in Greater Poland Voivodeship (west-central Poland)
Zygmuntowo, Nowy Tomyśl County in Greater Poland Voivodeship (west-central Poland)
Zygmuntowo, Rawicz County in Greater Poland Voivodeship (west-central Poland)